Aliko Nikusuma Kibona (born 16 May 1956) is a Tanzanian CCM politician and Member of Parliament for Ileje constituency since 2010.

References

1956 births
Living people
Chama Cha Mapinduzi MPs
Tanzanian MPs 2010–2015
Njombe Secondary School alumni
Institute of Finance Management alumni
Tumaini University Makumira alumni